Freienbach railway station may refer to:

 Freienbach SBB railway station on the Lake Zurich left-bank railway line in Switzerland
 Freienbach SOB railway station on the Pfäffikon SZ–Arth-Goldau railway line in Switzerland